James Gervé Conroy (April 12, 1836 – January 28, 1915) was an Irish-born lawyer, judge and political figure in Newfoundland. He represented Ferryland on the Irish Shore in the Newfoundland and Labrador House of Assembly from 1874 to 1880 as an Anti-Confederated, in the second term as an anti-confederated Liberal; he helped lead the opposition to William Vallance Whiteway's administration.

Later life
In 1870, Conroy married Elizabeth Catherine Mary Theresa O'Neill of the O'Neills of the Feeva, the only child of Charles Henry (Cáthal Ainrí) Ó Néill, a Dublin barrister and The O'Neill of Clanaboy, and his wife, Margaret O'Grady, who are buried in O'Connell Circle at Glasnevin E39.

They had one son, Charles O'Neill Conroy, born in Dublin, himself later a lawyer and businessman. In 1872, they came to Newfoundland, where he taught school for a time at Saint Bonaventure's College in St. John's. Later that year, Conroy was called to the Newfoundland bar and formed a partnership with John Hoyles Boone. He was founder and editor of the Irish Catholic newspaper the Terra Nova Advocate.

Conroy retired from politics in 1880 and was named a stipendiary magistrate and a judge in the court for the Central District. He served on the bench until his death in Montreal at the age of 78 while receiving medical treatment there. Conroy was buried in St. John's.

References

Members of the Newfoundland and Labrador House of Assembly
1836 births
1915 deaths
Newfoundland Colony judges
Dominion of Newfoundland judges
Irish emigrants to pre-Confederation Newfoundland
Canadian Roman Catholics